Russell Winter (born 17 August 1975 in Johannesburg, South Africa) is a former rugby union player and currently a forwards coach. Winter mainly played as a number eight.

He represented the South African Sevens side on two occasions – at the 1998 Hong Kong Sevens and the 1998 Commonwealth Games and was included in a South Africa A squad that toured Europe in 2001.

He joined English Premiership side Newcastle Falcons in 2006 and made 50 appearances for them before leaving at the end of the 2009 season.

References

External links
Newcastle Falcons profile

1975 births
Living people
Rugby union players from Johannesburg
Newcastle Falcons players
Golden Lions players
Lions (United Rugby Championship) players
Sharks (rugby union) players
Rugby union number eights
South African expatriate rugby union players
Expatriate rugby union players in England
South African expatriate sportspeople in England
South Africa international rugby sevens players
Rugby sevens players at the 1998 Commonwealth Games
Commonwealth Games rugby sevens players of South Africa
Commonwealth Games competitors for South Africa